The Last Supper is a 2014 Indian Malayalam-language adventure thriller film directed by Vinil Vasu starring Unni Mukundan, Anu Mohan, and Pearle Maaney. The film features three characters who journey from Kerala to Tamil Nadu and get trapped in a forest en route. The film was reported to be remade in Hindi by Vinil Vasu.

Plot

Cast 
Unni Mukundan as Alby
Anu Mohan as Imran
Pearle Maaney as Pearle

Production 
Unni Mukundan lost 17 kilograms to play the role of a computer hacker. While filming in Nelliampathi, Unni Mukundan fell in a river.

Soundtrack 
Music by Gopi Sundar. Pearle Maaney sung the song "Belly".

Release 
The film was initially scheduled to release on 2 May, but was postponed to 9 May. The film released alongside God's Own Country and My Dear Mummy.

Reception 
A critic from The Times of India rated the film one-and-a-half out of five stars and wrote that "In a badly written, poorly conceived film about three friends going on a trip to a devilish place, interest is confined to visuals, mostly of animals who appear regardless of their unique habitats". A critic from Sify gave the film a verdict of below average and opined that "The film manages to give you some scary moments but that is not all that you want from a movie for sure. This ?supper? leaves you wanting for more!"

References

External links 
 

Indian adventure thriller films
Films shot in Palakkad